Poolbrook is a village and a suburb of Malvern, Worcestershire, England, situated approximately 1.5 miles (2.4 km) southeast of Great Malvern, the  town's centre, and about 0.5 miles (08 km) from  the Malvern suburb of Barnards Green on the Poolbrook Road (B4208). The village comprises  several  shops, a traditional English pub, and a number of council and private housing estates.  St Andrew's C of E parish church was built in Early English  style in 1882 as a memorial to a member of the Chance Brothers glass manufacturing  family. The village occupies the geographical centre of the Chase ward of Malvern Town Council.

Transport

Rail

Bus
Local bus services connect Poolbrook with Barnards Green and the surrounding area  including the 42, S42 operated by Astons coaches stopping in Barnards Green bus shelter. Serving  areas further afield are: 
the  Malvern to  Worcester route 44, 44A, 44B operated by First Diamond serving stops  at  the  Barnards Green bus shelter and Pound Bank; The Worcester  -  Upton-upon-Severn - Malvern route 362/363 operated by Diamond serves that stops at  the Barnards Green bus shelter  and the Malvern - Gloucester - Cheltenham route 377 (Saturdays only) operated by  Diamond, stopping at  the Court Road shops and the Barnards Green bus shelter.

Air
The nearest major airport is Birmingham approximately one hour by road via the M5 and M42 motorways. Gloucestershire Airport located at Staverton, in the Borough of Tewkesbury near Malvern is a busy General Aviation airport used mainly for private charter and scheduled flights to destinations such as the islands of Jersey, Guernsey, and the Isle of Man, pilot training, and by the aircraft of emergency services.

References

External links

 St Andrew's parish church

Villages in Worcestershire